Agam Kuan ("unfathomable well") is an ancient well and archaeological site in Patna, India. It is said to date back to the period of Mauryan emperor, Ashoka (304–232 BCE). It is circular in shape, lined with brick in the upper  and wooden rings in the remaining .

The Agam Kuan is set within an archaeological site identified by the Archaeological Survey of India which also contains the adjacent Shitala Devi temple where the folk deity Shitala Devi is venerated. Inside this temple, the pindas of the Saptamatrikas (the seven mother goddesses) are worshipped. The temple is widely revered for its belief in curing smallpox and chicken pox.

Location
Agam Kuan is situated close to the Gulzarbagh railway station, on the way to Panch Pahadi, on the outskirts of Patna, Bihar state. It is east of Patna and south-west of Gulzarbagh Station. India

According to the legend
During the 1890s, the British explorer, Laurence Waddell, while exploring the ruins of Pataliputra, identified Agam Kuan as the legendary well built by Ashoka for the purpose of torture before he embraced Buddhism, as part of Ashoka's Hell chambers. The torture practice was also reported by Chinese travellers (most probably Fa Hien) of the 5th and 7th centuries A.D. The well is stated to have been used to torture convicts by throwing them into the fire that used to emanate from the well. Ashoka's Edict no. VIII makes mention of this well, which was also known as "fiery well" or "hell on earth". Another popular legend states that this was the well where Ashoka threw 99 of his elder half-brother's heads and put the heads in the well to obtain the throne of the Mauryan Empire.

According to a myth, the well has a subterranean link with the Patala (netherworld) or hell; this was inferred on the basis that a saint found a heavy log in the well which was supposed to have been lost in the sea. Another geo-hydrological link suggested that Agam Kuan is connected to the Ganges river.  The site is also connected with several Jain legends, the most notable of them being that of a Jain monk, Sudarshana, who, when thrown into the well by a king named Chand, floated to the surface and was found seated on a lotus.

Visitors throw coins into Agam Kuan, as it is still considered auspicious. It is used for many religious ceremonies, especially Hindu weddings. Although it is venerated, the well waters are not consumed. Offerings of flowers and coins are thrown into the well usually during summer months as the well's history is linked to "heat and hell". Dating to Mohammedan rule, the Mughal officials offered coins of gold and silver to Agam Kuan.

Features
It is brick-encased in the upper half to a depth of  while the lower  are secured by a series of wooden rings. Covered with moss, the surface structure, which now covers the well and forms its most distinctive feature, has eight arched windows. The well was refurbished during the reign of Emperor Akbar and a roofed structure was built around the well. This circular structure has been fitted with eight windows which are well placed.

Grounds

In addition to the Agam Kuan, the archaeological site features a temple, as well as several ancient and medieval sculptures. The Shitala Devi temple is adjacent to the well, and is dedicated to Shitala Devi, which houses the pindas of the Saptamatrikas (the seven mother goddesses). The temple is widely venerated for its belief in curing smallpox and chicken pox, and it is also visited by devotees for wish fulfillment. The temple's female priest is an uncommon practice.

A statue of Yaksha of the Mauryan art period stands guard outside the temple. It was described earlier by Alexander Cunningham when he visited the site in 1879–80. This artifact is not traceable in the present day.

See also
Patan Devi
Mahavir Mandir

References

Bibliography

Buildings and structures in Bihar
Maurya Empire
History of Bihar
Tourist attractions in Patna
Buildings and structures in Patna
Archaeological sites in Patna
Water wells in India